Athletics was one of the sports at the quadrennial Goodwill Games competition. Athletics competitions were held at every one of the five Goodwill Games. The final athletics events were held at the Games in 2001 as the 2005 edition of the Games were cancelled.

Editions

See also
List of Goodwill Games records in athletics

External links
All results from GBR Athletics
Past games from the official website

 
Goodwill Games
Sports at the Goodwill Games